Deer Island is an abandoned community in Newfoundland and Labrador.

References 

Ghost towns in Newfoundland and Labrador